Jonathan Bourhis (10 October 1990, in Tours – 1 November 2009) was a professional basketball player for JDA Dijon. He died in a car accident on 1 November 2009 at the age of 19. He was considered a very talented player and one of the best hopes of French basketball. His death was reported to be a "bad hit" for his team.

References

External links 
 LNB profile 

1990 births
2009 deaths
French men's basketball players
JDA Dijon Basket players
Road incident deaths in France
Sportspeople from Tours, France